The German Reform Movement was a political movement active in New York City during the late 19th century.

References 
 The German Reform Movement - Completion of the Arrangements of the Joint Mass-Meeting, The New York Times, October 26, 1871
 Very Jubilant Teutons, The New York Times, November 6, 1895.

German-American culture in New York City
German-American history
Political history of New York City